Danmark har talent ("Denmark has Talent", formerly Talent (2008–2010)) is Denmark's version of the Got Talent franchise and was in the same format as Britain's Got Talent. The first series aired in 2014 and was won by beatboxer Thorsen, and the second series aired late 2015 and finished in early 2016. The golden buzzer featured in both series. 
On the channel DR1 the show  was aired from 2008 to 2010. It was delayed in 2011 to 2014, In 2015 TV2 made the new season called Danmark Har Talent. The last season of “Danmark Har Talent”, aired in 2019 and after the season ended TV2 axed the show after 5 seasons on TV2.

Summary

Season 1 (2014)

First series was won by beatboxer Thorsen.

Season 2 (2015–2016)

Second series began on 28 December 2015 and finished in early 2016.

Season 3 (2017)

Season 4 (2018)

Season 5 (2019)

Got Talent
Danish reality television series
2014 Danish television series debuts
Danish television series based on British television series
Danish-language television shows
TV 2 (Denmark) original programming